The Santa Anita Derby is an American Grade 1 thoroughbred horse race for three-year-olds run each April at Santa Anita Park in Arcadia, California. It is currently run at a distance of  miles on the dirt and carries a purse of $400,000. It is one of the final prep races on the official Road to the Kentucky Derby.

History
Inaugurated in 1935, the Santa Anita Derby has long been considered the most important West Coast stepping-stone to the Kentucky Derby. Since 2013, it has been part of the official Road to the Kentucky Derby, offering the winner 100 points and thus assuring a position in the starting gate. Since its inception, ten Santa Anita Derby winners have gone on to win the Kentucky Derby (shown in bold in the Winners section below), plus seven horses who lost at Santa Anita went on to triumph in Kentucky. In 1988, Winning Colors became the first and to date only filly to win both Derbies. Santa Anita Derby winners have also been successful in other Triple Crown races, with Affirmed sweeping the series in 1978.

Now run at a distance of  miles (9 Furlongs), for the first three years it was run at  miles, and at  miles in 1947. Until 2008, the race had been run on a natural dirt surface.  The race has been contested on Cushion Track (2008) and Pro-Ride (2009 & 2010) artificial surfaces.  In 2011, the race returned to dirt.

In 1938, Stagecoach became the only colt to win both the Santa Anita Derby and the Santa Anita Handicap in the same year, defeating eventual Horse of the Year Seabiscuit in the latter.

Prep races leading to the Santa Anita Derby include the San Rafael Stakes, San Miguel Stakes, Sham Stakes, San Vicente Stakes, San Pedro Stakes, the Robert B. Lewis Stakes and the San Felipe Stakes, all run at Santa Anita Park. The Sham, Robert Lewis and San Felipe are also on the Road to the Kentucky Derby.

As a result of World War II, there were no races held from 1942 to 1944. The 2020 race was held on Saturday June 6 due to the COVID-19 outbreak.

Records
 At age 17, Pat Valenzuela became the youngest jockey to win the Santa Anita Derby when he rode Codex to victory in the 1980 race.
 In 2000, Jenine Sahadi became the first woman trainer to win the Santa Anita Derby.
 In 2005, Jeff Mullins became the first trainer to win three consecutive editions of the Santa Anita Derby.

Speed Record: 
Three horses share the record for the fastest winning time of 1:47 flat:
 Lucky Debonair (1965)
 Sham (1973)
 Indian Charlie (1998)

Most wins by an owner:
 3 – Rex Ellsworth (1955, 1956, 1963)

Most wins by a jockey:
 9 – Gary Stevens (1988, 1990, 1993, 1994, 1995, 1998, 1999, 2001, 2003)

Most wins by a Trainer:
 9 – Bob Baffert (1996, 1998, 1999, 2001, 2009, 2011, 2015, 2018, 2019)

Winners

† Indicates filly

Bold typeface indicates Kentucky Derby winner

See also

 Santa Anita Derby "top three finishers" and starters
 Road to the Kentucky Derby

References

External links
 Ten Things You Should Know About the Santa Anita Derby at Hello Race Fans!

Horse races in California
Santa Anita Park
Flat horse races for three-year-olds
Triple Crown Prep Races
Grade 1 stakes races in the United States
Graded stakes races in the United States
Recurring sporting events established in 1935
1935 establishments in California